Mohammdi  Assembly constituency is one of the 403  constituencies of the Uttar Pradesh Legislative Assembly, India. It  is a part of the Lakhimpur district and one of  the five assembly constituencies in the Dhaurahra Lok Sabha constituency. First election in this assembly constituency was held in 1957 after the "DPACO (1956)" (delimitation order) was passed in 1956. After the "Delimitation of Parliamentary and Assembly Constituencies Order" was passed in 2008, the constituency was assigned identification number 144.

Wards  / Areas
Extent  of Mohammdi  Assembly constituency is  KCs Mohammdi, Atwa Pipariya, Pasgawan, PCs Semraghat, Alliyapur, Pipri Aziz,  Barbar, Patvan, Ghaghpur, Dilawal Nagar, Bhounapur, Basara, Maqsoodpur of  Aurangabad KC, Mohammadi MB & Barbar NP of Mohammdi Tehsil.

Members of the Legislative Assembly

Election results

2022

2017

See also

Dhaurahra Lok Sabha constituency
Lakhimpur Kheri district
Sixteenth Legislative Assembly of Uttar Pradesh
Uttar Pradesh Legislative Assembly
Vidhan Bhawan

References

External links
 

Assembly constituencies of Uttar Pradesh
Politics of Lakhimpur Kheri district
Constituencies established in 1956